HMS Cornflower was an  sloop of the Royal Navy and from 1933 the Hong Kong Naval Volunteer Force (HKNVR).

Design and construction
The Arabis class was a slightly enlarged and improved derivative of the previous  and  sloops. They were designed at the start of the First World War as relatively fast minesweepers that could also carry out various miscellaneous duties in support of the fleet such as acting as dispatch vessels or carrying out towing operations, but as the war continued and the threat from German submarines grew, became increasingly involved in anti-submarine duties.

Displacement was  normal. The Arabis class had a main armament of two  guns or two  guns, with two 3-pounder (47 mm) anti-aircraft guns also carried.

Cornflower was one of a group of 21 Arabis-class sloops ordered on 15 July 1915. The ship was built by the Scottish shipbuilder Barclay, Curle and Company at their Whiteinch, Glasgow shipyard as yard number 537, was launched on 30 March 1916, and completed on 4 May that year.

Service
On commissioning, Cornflower joined the 1st Sloop Flotilla, as part of the Coast of Ireland Station, but by September 1916 was lasted as part of the East Indies and Egypt Station. In September 1917, she transferred to the East Indies Station, and in January 1918 had transferred to the Egyptian Division of the Mediterranean Fleet. Cornflower was still part of the Egyptian Division at the end of the war, and was a member of the 13th Sloop Flotilla.

Between 1919 and 1921, she was then transferred to the Dardanelles and the Black Sea, once again performing minesweeping duties. From 1921 to 1927, she was in the Red Sea, with duties including operations against slave traders.

In 1927, she relieved  in Hong Kong. On 31 March 1934, the Royal Navy presented the ship to the HKNVR on permanent loan as a drill ship. Hong Kong Commodore-in-Charge Frank Elliot replaced the crest and motto of the ship to that of Clan Eliott (Elliot's ancestor Charles Elliot had also been the first Administrator of Hong Kong). In April 1934, she was put under the command of Lieutenant-Commander H. S. Rouse. She remained stationery at Wan Chai where she served as the headquarters and training ship of the HKNVR.

The upkeep of the aging vessel became a significant financial burden for the volunteer navy. Under Article XIX of the Washington Naval Treaty, no new naval bases should be established in the Pacific, and Cornflower should "not be allowed to degenerate to a
hulk so that she can be considered part of the fixed defence of Hong Kong." By 1940, the ship was decrepit. A river steamer, SS Tai Hing, began to receive refitting in March 1940 to replace Cornflower as the headquarters of the HKNVR. The refitting was completed and the ship was formally handed over to the HKNVR in September. Tai Hing was renamed Cornflower after her predecessor to strengthen the unit's identify and esprit de corps. Cornflower was handed back to the Royal Navy to be broken up.

Notes

References

 

World War I sloops of the United Kingdom
Arabis-class sloops
Ships built on the River Clyde
1916 ships
World War II auxiliary ships of the United Kingdom
World War II auxiliary ships of Hong Kong